The Extra-Liga is an association of futsal clubs of Ukraine and the top men's futsal league in the country. It is organized by the Association of Mini-Football of Ukraine which is a collective member of the Ukrainian Association of Football (formerly Football Federation of Ukraine). The Ukrainian Association of Mini-Football is not part of the Olympic movement, but is a collective members of the Ukrainian Association of Football.

History 
In early 1990s futsal competitions along with other alternative types of association football such as beach football, football among women, others started to gain wider popularity worldwide and since 1996 there appeared continental competitions among European futsal clubs under auspices of UEFA.

The original Ukrainian championship among futsal clubs was founded in 1993 as a descendant of the general futsal movement among students in the Soviet Union. Prior to this, the Ukrainian teams played in the Soviet competitions that has been developing in late 1980s. The first Soviet competitions in 1990 and 1991 were conducted primarily in Ukraine. Among notable Ukrainian clubs of the Soviet period were Mekhanizator from Dnipropetrovsk, Syntez from Kremenchuk and others.

Following dissolution of the Soviet Union, the official Ukrainian competitions were reorganized after some pause in late 1993 as the Top League.

In 2011 a new Ukrainian futsal super league was formed, Extra-Liga, beginning in the 2011–12 season. Previously, the 8 highest finishing teams in the league advanced into the playoffs. The winner of the Championship playoffs gained qualification for the UEFA Futsal Cup.

Some regular association football clubs of Ukraine are fielding also their futsal squads, including both male and female. Other futsal clubs exist independently, while some such as MFC Interkas Kyiv originally competed in amateur competitions of association football before switching to futsal (indoor). Among notable footballers who competed in competitions of association football and later switched to futsal competitions is Stanislav Honcharenko.

Winners

Performance by club

See also 
 Ukrainian Women's Futsal Championship

External links 
 extra-liga.org.ua
 futsal.in.ua

Futsal competitions in Ukraine
Football leagues in Ukraine
Ukraine
Sports leagues established in 1993
1993 establishments in Ukraine
Futsal
Professional sports leagues in Ukraine